The Riddle of the Night  is a 2005 fantasy film directed by Ly Kim Srun starring Sok Sophea, Sim Solika, and Veth Rattana. The film was produced and distributed by Yvette Som and Angkorwat production. It was a success at the box office.

Cambodian fantasy films
2005 fantasy films
2005 films